Lyudmila Andreevna Sorokina  (19 August 1944 – 22 September 1998) was a Soviet, Russian teacher, museum worker, the first chief of the Museum of the Air Forces of the Northern Fleet.

Biography
Lyudmila Sorokina was born on August 19, 1944 in Platonovo village in the Khankaysky District of Primorsky Krai.

In 1969 she graduated from the Historical Faculty of Vologda State Pedagogical Institute. She worked in secondary educational institutions of Chelyabinsk, Vologda and Murmansk regions and in Moscow.

In 1973-1976 she was an employee of the Naval academy in Leningrad.

In 1977 she became a guide of the Museum of the Air Forces of the Northern Fleet in Safonovo (Severomorsk). After museum reorganisation, in December, 1977 Lyudmila Sorokina was appointed the first chief of the museum  that she supervised till September, 1985. Under her supervision the museum turned into a large museum complex that exhibits aircraft of the Russian Northern Fleet, Yuri Gagarin's house-museum, an hangar with a collection of aviation artifacts of the times of the Second World War and post-war time. The museum became the centre for the regional studies and military-patriotic work of Murmansk Oblast and all Kola peninsula. The museum is visited annually by some tens thousand Russian and foreign visitors.

After moving to Moscow, in 1985-1987 Lyudmila Sorokina worked as a research worker for Mikhail Frunze Central House of Aircraft and Astronautics.

Lyudmila Sorokina received state awards: Medal "In Commemoration of the 850th Anniversary of Moscow" (1997) and the Medal "Veteran of Labour" (1985).

She died on September, 22nd, 1998 and is buried in Moscow.

External links
 "The Independent Newspaper", appendix "Subbotnik". Release № 25 (72) from June, 30th, 2001.
 Heroes of the polar sky. The newspaper "Hooter". Release from November, 4th, 2004.
 Museum of the Air Forces of the Northern Fleet. A picture album.
 Museum of the Air Forces of the Northern Fleet.
 Five days behind Polar circle.
 Garrison Fedotovo. Fedotovsky evening school.

1944 births
1998 deaths
People from Khankaysky District
Directors of museums in Russia
Women museum directors